Epidius may refer to:
Epidius - ancient Roman rhetorician
Epidius (spider) - a genus of crab spiders